Konstantin Andreyevich Trenyov (– May 19, 1945) was a Soviet Russian writer and playwright, USSR State Prize laureate (1941), best known for his Russian Civil War history drama Lyubov Yarovaya (1926).

Selected bibliography
 Doroginy (Дорогины, 1910, play)
 Vladyka (Владыка, 1915, short stories)
 Pugachovschina (Пугачёвщина, 1924, play)
 Lyubov Yarovaya (Любовь Яровая, 1926, play)
 Gymnasists (Гимназисты, 1936, play)
 On Neva Banks (На берегу Невы, 1937, play)

References

1876 births
1945 deaths
People from Kharkiv Oblast
People from Volchansky Uyezd
Russian male novelists
Russian male short story writers
Russian male dramatists and playwrights
Soviet dramatists and playwrights
Soviet male writers
20th-century male writers
Stalin Prize winners
Recipients of the Order of the Red Banner of Labour
Writers from the Russian Empire